Laxmipuram is a small village in Palasa mandal, Srikakulam District Telangana, India. It is one of the developing villages in Palasa Mandal. Most of the people in this village are farmers or government employees. The village has a high literacy rate. Younger residents have begun to move out of the village to more urban areas including nearby city, Khammam. The village risks population loss as many continue to emigrate leaving older populations behind.

References

Villages in Srikakulam district